Han Jong-Woo (born 17 March 1986) is a South Korean retired footballer who played as midfielder.

Career
He was selected by Jeonbuk Hyundai Motors in 2009 K-League Draft. But he made no appearance in the Motors.

He joined Challengers League side Bucheon FC 1995 in 2012.

In 2015, as the contract with Bucheon FC 1995 was over, he joined Pocheon Citizen FC.

In 2016, he joined Gimpo Citizen FC. He retired at the end of 2021.

References

External links 

1986 births
Living people
Association football midfielders
South Korean footballers
Suwon FC players
Jeonbuk Hyundai Motors players
Bucheon FC 1995 players
Korea National League players
K League 1 players
K League 2 players
K3 League (2007–2019) players
K3 League players
Sangji University alumni